Albert Malet (1905 – 9 September 1986) was a French painter of the Rouen school.

Malet was born at Bosc-le-Hard.  A retrospective of his work was held at the hôtel de Bourgtheroulde at Rouen in 2006.

Bibliography 

 François Lespinasse, L'École de Rouen, Fernandez, Sotteville-lès-Rouen, 1980
 François Lespinasse, L'École de Rouen, Lecerf, Rouen, 1995

External links 
 Wally Findlay Galleries International

1905 births
1986 deaths
20th-century French painters
20th-century French male artists
French male painters
Post-impressionist painters